Sue Falsone  is an American athletic trainer. She was the Head Athletic Trainer for the Los Angeles Dodgers in Major League Baseball from 2012 to 2013, and was the first female head athletic trainer in the major American professional sports leagues.

Early life 

Falsone grew up in Buffalo, New York. She graduated from Daemen College with a bachelor's degree in physical therapy and earned a master's degree in human movement science from the University of North Carolina. She obtained board certifications as a Clinical Specialist in Sports Physical Therapy, a Certified Athletic Trainer, and a Strength and Conditioning Specialist.

Career
Falsone spent seven years working for Athletes' Performance Institute (API), a private fitness facility catering to professional athletes, before she was hired as the team physical therapist for the Los Angeles Dodgers in October, 2007.  While based out of the Phoenix area with Athletes' Performance Institute, Falsone worked with major leaguers, including Curt Schilling, and reportedly traveled to Boston multiple times to complete his physical therapy in 2005.  She worked closely with API founder Mark Verstegen and credits him with her early development. She retained the position of Director of Physical Therapy for API when she joined the Dodgers.

Los Angeles Dodgers 

When Falsone was hired by the Dodgers in late 2007 (to start in the 2008 season), she became the first female team physical therapist in Major League Baseball history. Falsone spent three seasons with the Dodgers as physical therapist, from 2008–2010, and traveled with the team.  She treated several players recovering from injury during that period, including Rafael Furcal and Andre Ethier. She also participated in a Dodgers-sponsored paid baseball clinic teaching strength and conditioning for the public and was cited in media reports about Tom Brady's 2008 injury discussing recovery from ACL surgery. In a pre-season team-building exercise in February 2008, Falsone played the part of American Idol judge Paula Abdul in a performance modeled after the show, called "Dodger Idol".  During the 2011 season, Falsone returned to Phoenix and API full-time, but remained a consultant for the Dodgers.

In October 2011, it was reported that Falsone would be hired as the Dodgers' Head Athletic Trainer for the 2012 season, to replace Stan Conte in the wake of his promotion. She retained her position as SPI's Vice President of Performance Physical Therapy and Team Sports. ESPN commentator Curt Schilling, a prior patient of hers, stated "I can't imagine anyone more equipped to get that position, both from an intelligence perspective and the makeup of her personality... She was destined for this." Falsone's philosophy as head trainer includes a heavy emphasis on prevention, what she calls "prehab", rather than solely providing treatment.

Falsone is the first female head athletic trainer in any major American professional sports league. Along with assistant athletic trainer Nancy Patterson, she also became part of the only pair of female athletic trainers in the same staff in American professional sports history. Falsone has stated that she has not encountered disrespect from players due to her gender, and that she has been able to build good working relationships with them. She refrains from entering the clubhouse while players are dressing. Much was made of the historic nature of her hiring; Falsone herself noted that she was overwhelmed by the outpouring of support from the public, while also saying that "it's surprising it's taken until 2011 for this to happen". Falsone has been the subject of several profiles in recent years, including a segment with Erica Hill on the Today and a segment on the NBC Nightly News. While she has faced gender-based criticism, mostly on the Internet and social media, Falsone has also been surprised by the number of young female fans she has who see her as a role model.

Falsone came under some criticism from fans due to the large number of high-profile of injuries in the first half of the Dodgers' 2013 season, but there has been no indication that the training staff's methods were at fault or that her job was in danger.  Several players, including Ethier, Jerry Hairston, and Mark Ellis, and manager Don Mattingly praised her skill and sensitivity in media reports.

On October 21, 2013, Falsone announced that she would be leaving the Dodgers to pursue other opportunities.

References 

Major League Baseball trainers
Living people
Los Angeles Dodgers personnel
University of North Carolina alumni
Sportspeople from Buffalo, New York
Sportspeople from Phoenix, Arizona
American women physicians
Athletic trainers
Year of birth missing (living people)
21st-century American women